Boxford is a village and civil parish in the unitary authority of West Berkshire, England. The hamlet of Westbrook is on the opposite bank of the Berkshire Downs tributary.

Archaeology
A number of Bronze Age features have been recorded near Boxford, and an urn of this period has been found. A hearth and pottery fragments from the Iron Age, including a La Tène pot, have been found near the north end of Boxford Common. Iron Age pottery fragments and a possible earthwork have also been found near Borough Hill. Mud Hall Cottage on Wyfield Farm is the site of a large Roman building which was excavated about 1870. Roman pottery and coins have been found at Boxford Rectory. The course of the Ermin Way Roman road that linked Corinium Dobunnorum (Cirencester) and Calleva Atrebatum (Silchester) passes through the south of the parish. A  section is visible from aerial archaeology near William's Copse. The Boxford Roman mosaic, perhaps  square, was found in 2017. It was on the floor of a villa dating from the 4th century AD.

Manor
In 958 King Eadred granted property at Boxore to his servant Wulfric, and in 968 King Edgar the Peaceful granted a similar amount of property here to his servant Elfwin. Both men ceded their holdings to Abingdon Abbey, which thus held the whole manor of Boxford before the Norman Conquest. The Domesday Book of 1086 records Boxford as Bochesorne. It says under the list of lands that belonged to Abingdon Abbey:

 

Boxford House is a Grade II listed country house which is believed to date from 1825. It is built of ashlar masonry in a Gothic revival style, with mullioned and transomed windows. It has a slate roof and a parapet.

Parish church
The Church of England parish church of Saint Andrew consists of a chancel, nave, north aisle, north-west vestry, south porch and a west bell tower. The chancel may be Anglo-Saxon, and an Anglo-Saxon window was discovered in a wall of the church in 2011. The Jacobean pulpit dates from 1618, the font from about 1662 and the west tower from about 1692. Much of the church was rebuilt in the Victorian era and in 1841 the north aisle was added. However, the arcade between the nave and north aisle was probably by John Oldrid Scott and Sons in 1908. The building is Grade II* listed.

Social and economic history
The village has a number of thatched cottages and a watermill. Boxford railway station was opened by the Lambourn Valley Railway in 1898 and closed by British Railways in 1960. Boxford is known for the Boxford Masques, an outdoor midsummer celebration, held on Hoar Hill in woodland above the village, overlooking the Lambourn valley. It was originally created in the late 19th century by Charlotte Peake, a local writer and lover of music, drama and poetry. The Boxford Masques were performed by locals and lasted up until the First World War. It was revived in the year 2000 by the Watermill Theatre of Bagnor, near Newbury, following extensive research by John Vigor; it has been very popular since. The 2012 production was performed at the nearby Welford House and bore the name A Little Drama at the Big House, telling the story of the founding of the plays, based on fact and re-imagined by Geraldine McCaughrean.

Geography
Boxford has several sites of Special Scientific Interest (SSSI); Easton Farm Meadow, Boxford Chalk Pit and Boxford Water Meadows.

Demography

References

Sources

External links

Villages in Berkshire
West Berkshire District
Civil parishes in Berkshire